Heiderun Ludwig (born 18 September 1940) is an Austrian cross-country skier. She competed in two events at the 1964 Winter Olympics.

Cross-country skiing results

Olympic Games

References

1940 births
Living people
Austrian female cross-country skiers
Olympic cross-country skiers of Austria
Cross-country skiers at the 1964 Winter Olympics
People from Dornbirn
Sportspeople from Vorarlberg
20th-century Austrian women